is a Japanese manga series written and illustrated by Arata Kawabata. It was serialized in Shogakukan's seinen manga magazine Monthly Big Comic Spirits from January 2016 to October 2017, with its chapters collected in four tankōbon volumes.

Publication
Written and illustrated by Arata Kawabata, Shingun no Cadet was serialized in Shogakukan's seinen manga magazine Monthly Big Comic Spirits from January 27, 2016, to October 27, 2017. Shogakukan collected its chapters in four tankōbon volumes, released from January 27, 2016, to December 12, 2017.

Volume list

See also
Do You Like the Nerdy Nurse?, another manga series by the same author

References

External links
 

Dark fantasy anime and manga
Military anime and manga
Seinen manga
Shogakukan manga